The Battle of Nietjärvi (15–17 July 1944) was part of the Continuation War between Finland and the Soviet Union, which occurred during World War II. The battle ended in a Finnish victory.

Background: U-line prepares to meet a Soviet attack
Nietjärvi is a name of a village by Lake Nietjärvi ("järvi" meaning lake). The place is located in the Ladoga Karelia district, north of Lake Ladoga (in the southwestern corner of the Aunus Karelia frontier), in an area which belonged to Finland up to the end of the Continuation War (1944).  Here, Finland's Aunus Group was in 11–12 July 1944, ready in positions at the U defense line, expecting an enemy offense. The construction of the U defense line had been launched seven months earlier on the level of Nietjärvi – Lemetti – Loimola, as the fortified line behind the PSS-line (Pisi – Saarimäki – Sammatus), which was the most heavily fortified defense line in the Olonets Karelia (north and northeast of Lake Ladoga).

The frontline—up till July 1944—had been following closely the banks of the River Svir, which flows from Lake Onega to Lake Ladoga. Before battles even begun Finns abandoned the bridgehead which they had occupied on the southern shore of Svir when troop transfers to the Karelian Isthmus made it impractical to hold. Behind the frontline there was a secondary defensive line before the strong PSS line for the Finnish Army to slow down the Soviet advance. The long-awaited Soviet offensive begun with overwhelming force and managed to push through Finnish defenses at the front line. Attack stalled at the PSS line but combined effort from assaulting troops and from naval infantry landing behind the Finnish lines made holding PSS impossible for the Finns who started withdrawing towards U line while delaying Soviet advance.

During the previous three weeks, the Finnish defenders had managed to delay and disturb the advancement of the enemy offensive, wearing down and eating away the sharpest edge of the Soviet attack. Withdrawing Finnish stopped at U line and after finding out the Finnish defenses the Soviets begun to make local probing attacks against the U-line in an attempt to locate possible weak spots suitable for a breakthrough attempt from the Finnish defense line. Decision was made to breach Finnish defenses along the main coastal road at Nietjärvi and advance to Kittilä. Reaching Kittilä would provide access to better maintained Finnish road network as well as several roads to Finnish rear areas (Sortavala, Värtsilä and Matkaselkä).

In the dawn of 15 July, the formation of the Finnish 5th Division was as follows:  The line between Lake Ladoga and Nietjärvi was defended by 44th Infantry Regiment, commanded by Lieutenant Colonel Ilmari Rytkönen. The 2nd Infantry Regiment defended on the northeastern side of Nietjärvi under command of Colonel Heikki Saure.

Combat activities
In the morning of 15 July 1944, the Soviet artillery and mortars opened fierce fire preparations. Resulting dust, sand and smoke clouds severely reduced the visibility making it difficult to see anything. Red Army followed the artillery preparation with infantry assault supported with armored units. By mid-day, the Finnish defense had been able to stop the Soviet attacks everywhere else, but on the west side of Nietjärvi where 1st and 3rd battalions of 44th Infantry Regiment were unable to hold back the Soviets. Soviets followed their initial success with another breakthrough attempt on the northwestern shore of Lake Nietjärvi, in Yrjölä. Lack of reserves made it difficult for the Finns to respond to Soviet attacks but by the evening the Finns had succeeded in stopping the Red Army breakthrough attempt apart from a 400 m wide section of the line which the Soviets held tight. Throughout the evening the Soviet offensive continued relentlessly backed by heavy air support. Also the Finnish Air Force took part in the battle by bombing the Red Army formations on the southeastern edge of Lake Nietjärvi. Artillery battalions supporting Finnish 5th Division fired 10,170 rounds and mortars 4,900 during 15 July.

The Finnish counter-attack to regain the defense line was launched in the morning. The entire day saw continuous heavy fighting. At the evening the Soviets held on to a part of the Nietjärvi village, and a part of the defense line (stretch of a line consisting of connected trenches) on a low hill in that area. As frontal assault was deemed to be too expensive Finns chose to cut off the Soviets by assaulting along the trenches with artillery being used to prevent Soviet reinforcements from reaching the area. At 22:30, the same evening (16 July), the Finnish artillery and mortars began an artillery preparation which was immediately followed with infantry assault along the trenches from the both ends, using automatic rifles, hand grenades and flame throwers.

In the early morning hours of 17 July 1944, the Finnish units approaching the trench from both ends managed to link up with the help of the flame throwers. Only a small portion of the Red Army soldiers trapped to the trench or beyond it had escaped. Soviet forces tried to support the troops fighting in the trenches but Finnish artillery prevented reinforcements from reaching the area.

Losses, and conclusion
The Red Army had not been able to penetrate through the defense of the Finnish 5th Division in the U-line. The heaviest losses were suffered by the Soviet 114th Rifle Division.  The Soviet 762nd Rifle Regiment was destroyed totally. The Finns captured the Red Army message to its headquarters:  "The Regiment destroyed, the flag saved". The main bulk of the two other regiments of the Soviet 114th Division were destroyed as well. Also, the Soviet 272nd Rifle Division suffered heavy losses. Around 40 Red Army tanks, which had attacked in the direction of Nietjärvi, were also lost. The breakthrough attempt had cost the Soviets over 6,000 casualties, of which over 2 000 as dead in this relatively short period but very brutal battle. Not many Red Army soldiers were captured by the Finns.

The Finnish Army suffered 500 dead or missing and 700 wounded. Some soldiers might have deceased outside of the Nietjärvi battleground.

Finnish field artillery fired in U-line during five days period (11 -15 July) more rounds than in any other battle during summer 1944, total 54,300, while mortars fired 24,400. Average 15,740 rounds per day (10,860 field artillery rounds).Infantry battalions got also record highest artillery support (1.4 artillery battalions per infantry battalion). System using surprise element with very short half minute or one minute artillery barrages and counter-battery firing decimated enemy forces heavily. And this happened without notable Finnish air force support.

The efficient cooperation of the elements of the Finnish armed forces helped the Aunus Group to stop the Soviet Karelian Front's advance along the shores of Ladoga—at the U-line. Especially Finnish concentrated field artillery and mortar fire power played once again vital role as in many other critical combats during summer of 1944. Soviet 7th Army's attempt to get around of the U line resulted smaller engagements in the frontier north of lake Ladoga. The Soviet move to extend the front required Finns to extend their line as well which set the stage for the battle of Ilomantsi fought further to the north. The Finnish defense had prevented the Red Army from advancing from the north side of Lake Ladoga into the battle stages of the Karelian Isthmus. If the Red Army would not have been stopped here, the Finnish forces fighting on the Karelian Isthmus would have been left between two Soviet armies on the narrow Isthmus, in the area limited by the Gulf of Finland in the south, and Lake Ladoga in the north.

References 

Nietjarvi
Finland in World War II
1944 in Finland
July 1944 events
Karelo-Finnish Soviet Socialist Republic